Norie-Miller Walk is an urban park in the Scottish city of Perth, on the eastern banks of the River Tay. Named for Sir Stanley Norie-Miller, Bt, MC, DL, JP (1888–1973) it is situated between Smeaton's Bridge to the north and Queen's Bridge immediately to the south.

In 2017, the park was lit up, in an event known as Light Nights, for a celebration in honour of Robert Burns.

Gallery

References

Parks in Perth, Scotland